Turbonilla arnoldoi is a species of sea snail, a marine gastropod mollusk in the family Pyramidellidae, the pyrams and their allies.

Description
The shell grows to a length of 1.7 mm.

Distribution
This species occurs in the following locations:
 Caribbean Sea : Curaçao, Colombia
 Gulf of Mexico

References

External links
 To Encyclopedia of Life
 To World Register of Marine Species
 

arnoldoi
Gastropods described in 1988